Minvoul is a town in Woleu-Ntem Province, Gabon.

Location
It is near the border with Cameroon and is near a tributary of the Ntem River. It is served by Minvoul Airport.

Populated places in Woleu-Ntem Province